Jamhuri Sports Club, is a football club based in Pemba Island, Zanzibar. 

Jamhuri was established in 1953, and at that time was called Barghash Sports Club. After the Zanizibar revolution in 1964, the name was changed to Jamhuri. 

The main rival team is Mwenge S.C. as both team are located in Wete. Jamhuri was the first team from Pemba Island to be crowned champions of the Zanzibar Premier League.

Achievements
Zanzibar Premier League : 1
 2003
Mapinduzi Cup : 1
 1998

Performance in CAF competitions
CAF Confederation Cup: 1 appearance
2012 –

References

External links
Team profile – footballzz.com

Football clubs in Tanzania
Zanzibari football clubs
1953 establishments in Zanzibar
Association football clubs established in 1953